Pietà per chi cade (i. e. Compassion for those who fall) is a 1954 Italian melodrama film written and directed by Mario Costa and starring Amedeo Nazzari, Antonella Lualdi and Nadia Gray.

Plot

Cast 

Amedeo Nazzari as  Carlo
Antonella Lualdi as  Bianca
Nadia Gray as  Anna
Lída Baarová as Aunt Eugenia
Andrea Checchi as  Andrea
Massimo Serato as  Livio
Emilio Cigoli as  Marsi
 Lia Rainer as Gianna
Carlo D'Angelo as Lawyer
Cesare Fantoni as Prosecutor
Carlo Tamberlani as Judge
Miranda Campa 
 Lucia Banti

References

External links

Pietà per chi cade at Variety Distribution

Italian drama films
1954 drama films
Films directed by Mario Costa
Films scored by Carlo Rustichelli
1954 films
Italian black-and-white films
Melodrama films
1950s Italian films